Salih Uçan (born 6 January 1994) is a Turkish professional footballer who plays as a midfielder for Beşiktaş.

Club career

Fenerbahçe
Fenerbahçe signed Uçan for €1.4 million on 6 June 2012, for a five-year contract worth €220,000 per season. This transfer fee marked the highest fee paid to a Turkish youth player. On 14 March 2013, he scored his debut goal for the club in an UEFA Europa League match against Viktoria Plzeň in the round of 16. His contribution helped Fenerbahçe secure qualification to the quarter-finals of the Europa League with a 1–1 draw in the Şükrü Saracoğlu Stadium. He scored two goals against Orduspor on 7 April 2013 and helped Fenerbahçe win four games in a row in the Süper Lig.

Roma (loan)
On 7 July 2014, after weeks of protracted negotiations, Uçan's move to Roma on a two-year loan deal for a fee of €4.75 million was completed. The agreement included an option for Roma to either extend the loan by another year or to sign Uçan outright for €11 million in 2016. He made his official Roma debut in the 3–0 victory against Chievo on 18 October 2014. After two years with just 10 appearances, Roma chose to not make use of the option of a permanent signing.

In July 2016 Uçan returned to Fenerbahçe at the end of his two-year loan spell at Roma but 1 year later he loaned out again to Swiss club Sion.

Sion (loan)
On 31 August 2017, he was loaned out for a second time joining Swiss Super League FC Sion. In his one-year loan spell he played 19 league matches and 1 match in the Swiss Cup.

In July 2018 Uçan returned to Fenerbahçe for second time at the end of his one-year loan spell at Sion however he played friendly matches on his second return.

Empoli (loan)
On 17 August 2018, Uçan joined to Italian Serie A club Empoli on loan until 30 June 2019. Uçan  scored on his debut for the club, the final goal in a 3–3 draw with Frosinone on 21 October 2018.

On 31 January 2019, the last day of the 2018–19 winter transfer window, it was announced that the move had been made permanent.

Alanyaspor
On 10 July 2019, Uçan signed to Turkish club Alanyaspor.

Beşiktaş
After his contract expired with Alanyaspor in June 2021, Uçan joined current Turkish champions Beşiktaş on a free transfer. On 4 July 2021, Beşiktaş announced the arrival of Uçan.

International career
Uçan played all the age categories for Turkish national team. He was also a part of Turkey national under-20 football team during the 2013 FIFA U-20 World Cup. On 15 November 2013, he played his first national match for Turkey against Northern Ireland in Adana.

Career statistics

Club

1.Includes Turkish Cup.
2.Includes Turkish Super Cup, Supercoppa Italiana
3.Includes UEFA Champions League, UEFA Cup and UEFA Super Cup.

Honours
Fenerbahçe
 Süper Lig: 2013–14
 Turkish Cup: 2012–13

References

External links
 
 
 
 
 

1994 births
Living people
People from Marmaris
Turkish footballers
Turkey international footballers
Turkey under-21 international footballers
Turkey youth international footballers
Association football midfielders
Süper Lig players
TFF First League players
Serie A players
Swiss Super League players
Fenerbahçe S.K. footballers
Bucaspor footballers
Beşiktaş J.K. footballers
İstanbul Başakşehir F.K. players
A.S. Roma players
Empoli F.C. players
Turkish expatriate footballers
Turkish expatriate sportspeople in Italy
Expatriate footballers in Italy